Malekabad-e Somaq (also Romanized as Malekābād-e Somaq; also known as Malekābād) is a village in Teshkan Rural District, Chegeni District, Dowreh County, Lorestan Province, Iran. At the 2006 census, its population was 829, in 181 families.

References 

Towns and villages in Dowreh County